= Teresiah Kwamboka Omosa =

Kenyan long-distance runner

Personal information
- Nationality: Kenyan
- Born: Teresiah Kwamboka Omosa; February 5, 1995 (age 31) Kenya
- Occupation: Long-distance runner
- Years active: 2016–present

Sport
- Country: Kenya
- Sport: Athletics
- Events: Marathon, Half marathon

Achievements and titles
- Personal bests: Marathon: 2:30:12 (S7 Marathon, 2021); Half Marathon: 1:10:29 (Valencia, 2022/2023)

Teresiah Kwamboka Omosa (born 5 February 1995) is a Kenyan long-distance runner who has won several international marathon and half marathon events.

== Career ==
Teresiah Kwamboka Omosa's career in road racing began around 2016, with an early notable performance being her 4th-place finish at the Cardiff University Cardiff Half Marathon, where she achieved a personal best of 1:13:09.

In 2018, she won the Salzburg Marathon with a time of 2:43:23. Her personal best in the marathon was set in 2021 at the S7 Marathon, where she clocked 2:30:12. This event took place in Fürstenfeld, Austria.

Omosa recorded her half marathon personal best of 1:10:29 on two occasions: first on 30 October 2022 and again on 25 March 2023, both in Valencia.

In 2022, she finished 7th at the Vienna City Marathon with a time of 2:31:44. In 2025, Omosa won the Tel Aviv Marathon with a time of 2:37:36. She also claimed victory at the 2025 Kigali International Peace Marathon, setting a championship record of 2:37:10.

== Personal bests ==
- Marathon: 2:30:12 – S7 Marathon, Fürstenfeld, Austria, 2021
- Half Marathon: 1:10:29 – Valencia, Spain, 2022/2023

== Major results ==
Year	Competition	Location	Position	Time
2016	Cardiff University Cardiff Half Marathon	Cardiff, UK	4th	1:13:09
2018	Salzburg Marathon	Salzburg, Austria	1st	2:43:23
2021	S7 Marathon	Fürstenfeld, Austria	4th	2:30:12
2022	Vienna City Marathon	Vienna, Austria	7th	2:31:44
2025	Tel Aviv Marathon	Tel Aviv, Israel	1st	2:37:36
2025	Kigali International Peace Marathon	Kigali, Rwanda	1st	2:37:10
